Louis Milton Teicher (pronounce as TIE-cher; August 24, 1924 – August 3, 2008) was an American piano player, half of the piano duo Ferrante & Teicher.

"No one was more blessed than I to have Lou Teicher as my best friend since we met at the Juilliard School of Music at the ages of 9 and 6. Although we were two individuals, at the twin pianos our brains worked as one. Lou was certainly one of the world's most gifted pianists. I will miss him dearly and as pianists it's ironic how we both ended up living on keys," his longtime partner Arthur Ferrante, who lived on Longboat Key, Florida, said in a statement at the time of Teicher's death. Ferrante subsequently died on September 19, 2009.

Teicher was born in Wilkes-Barre, Pennsylvania to a Jewish family. He became a resident of Englewood Cliffs, New Jersey in the 1970s.

Teicher died of heart failure at his summer home in Highlands, North Carolina, aged 83. He was survived by his wife, Betty, as well as his former wife, Elaine Sutin, a professional violinist with both the New York Pops and the Sutton Ensemble, and three children, Richard, Susan and David, and four grandchildren.

References

External links
 

Easy listening musicians
1924 births
2008 deaths
American classical pianists
Male classical pianists
American male pianists
Classical piano duos
Juilliard School alumni
People from Englewood Cliffs, New Jersey
20th-century classical pianists
20th-century American pianists
20th-century American male musicians